Vidyasagar College has produced a large number of notable people, who has kept a remark on the society, since the foundation. The institute was previously a public school named "Metropolitan Institution", before upgrading to College. In 1871, the institute was upgraded to college and in 1917, the institute was named Vidyasagar College.

Notable alumni before upgradation to college (before 1871)
The notable alumnus of Metropolitan Institution before 1971, which was then a notable school, include:
Swami Vivekananda, philosopher and Hindu monk
Bhaktisiddhanta Sarasvati, philosopher and Hindu monk
Brahmabandhav Upadhyay, theologian, journalist and Indian freedom fighter
Charu Chandra Bhattacharya, Bengali writer on scientific articles mainly for children
Priyanath Bose, circus performer and entrepreneur

Notable alumni after upgradation to college (after 1871)
The following list consists notable alumnus passed from or associated with Vidyasagar College after upgrading to College.

Freedom fighters, activists and revolutionaries
Abinash Chandra Bhattacharya, noted for his role in the Indo-German Conspiracy of World War I
Barada Bhushan Chakraborty, Communist peasant leader, one of the prominent faces of Tebhaga movement
Chintamani Panigrahi, freedom fighter, participated in Indian Independence Movement
 Ganesh Man Singh, Nepalese freedom fighter, termed as "Father of Democracy" or the "Iron-man of Nepali politics"
 Ram Manohar Lohia, activist in Quit India Movement, Indian Independence Movement, editor of its mouthpiece Congress Socialist who broadcast Congress Radio, secretly from various places in Bombay during dependant India

Literature personalities
Upendrakishore Ray Chowdhury, famous Bengali writer
 Sharadindu Bandyopadhyay, Bengali novelist
 Ananda Chandra Agarwala, Assamese writer, poet
Durga Mohan Bhattacharyya, scholar of Sanskrit
Sarat Chandra Goswami, writer in Assam, founder member of Asam Sahitya Sabha
Himanish Goswami, writer, journalist, and cartoonist
Ajit Dutta, Bengali poet & author
Dhirendralal Dhar, Indian National Award winner for his contributions to Children's literature

Scholers, scientists and academic heads
Ajoy Home, aviculturist, ornithologist and naturalist
Durga Mohan Bhattacharyya, scholar of Sanskrit
Jagat Jiban Ghosh, researcher and scientist in Biological Sciences, Biochemistry, Neurobiochemistry; associated with teaching and research activities of J.J.Ghosh researth institutes.
 Prafulla Chandra Ray, chemist, regarded as the father of chemical science in India
Radheshyam Brahmachari, scholer
Sarada Charan Das, scientist
Saratchandra Mitra, scholer, scientist on plants and trees and founding head of the department of anthropology at the University of Calcutta
Satya Churn Law, Ornithologist

Cine personalities
 Chhabi Biswas, Notable Bengali actor and theatre artist
Debaki Bose, film director, awarded with Padma Shri
Himangshu Dutta, Bengali music director
Jayasree Bhattacharyya, film director
Kshirode Prasad Vidyavinode, poet, novelist, dramatist and nationalist
Madhu Bose, film director, actor, singer and screenwriter
Paoli Dam, notable Bengali actress
Subhra Sourav Das, notable actor worked at Kaushik Sen's theatre group Swapnasandhani.
Tarachand Barjatya, actor and founder of Rajshri Productions

Singers
 Manna Dey, notable singer
Ruprekha Banerjee, notable singer specialised in Rabindrasangeet and Hindustani Classical Music
Sailajaranjan Majumdar, Rabindra Sangeet singer and teacher
Silajit Majumder, Bengali singer
Vishmadev Chattopadhyay, eminent vocal artist in Indian Classical Music, a revered Guru in the Delhi Gharana of the vocal classical genre

Politicians
Chintamani Panigrahi, former Governor of Manipur
 Ganesh Man Singh, leader of the democratic movement of 1990 in Nepal, referred as "Iron Man of Nepal Politics".
Jyotipriya Mallick, Cabinet Minister, Minister for Department of Forest Affairs and Non-Conventional and Renewable Energy Sources in Government of West Bengal
 Ram Manohar Lohia, founder of the Congress Socialist Party
 Ram Sunder Das,  former Chief Minister of Bihar 
Sadhan Pande, former Minister for Consumer Affairs & Self Help Group & Self-Employment
Tarit Baran Topdar, former Member of Parliament, Lok Sabha in Government of West Bengal
Shyamaprasanna Bhattacharyya, former Member of Legislative Assembly in Government of West Bengal

Sports
Gostha Pal, Indian footballer
Asim Mukhopadhyay, mountaineer
 Brojen Das, Bangadeshi swimmer, first Asian to swim across the English Channel, and the first person to cross it six times
Dipankar Ghosh, mountaineer
Pankaj Roy, Indian cricketer
Priyanath Bose, circus performer, considered to be one the pioneers of circus in India.

Other personalities
 Prabhat Ranjan Sarkar, religious leader, philosopher and founder of Ananda marga spiritual organization also founder of PROUT, author of Neohumanism, Prabhat Samgiita
Mitter Bedi, notable photographer specialising in industrial photography
Jitendra Nath Ghosh, chairman of Netaji Research Bureau

References

Vidyasagar College Kolkata